Teucrium sessiliflorum, commonly known as camel bush, is a species of flowering plant in the family Lamiaceae and is endemic to southern continental Australia. It is a tufted perennial herb with hairy, egg-shaped, lobed leaves and white or cream-coloured flowers.

Description
The flowers are arranged singly or in pairs near the ends of the stems and are sessile at the base of a leaf-like bract. Flowering occurs from August to October.

Taxonomy
Teucrium sessiliflorum was formally described in 1848 by George Bentham in de Candolle's Prodromus Systematis Naturalis Regni Vegetabilis. The specific epithet (sessiliflorum) means "sessile-flowered".

Distribution and habitat
Camel bush grows in mallee in sandy soil and occurs south of Hillston in New South Wales, in the far north-west of Victoria, south-eastern South Australia and south-western Western Australia.

Conservation status
Teucrium sessiliflorum is classified as "not threatened" by the Western Australian Government Department of Parks and Wildlife.

References

sessiliflorum
Lamiales of Australia
Plants described in 1848
Taxa named by George Bentham
Eudicots of Western Australia
Flora of South Australia
Flora of New South Wales
Flora of Victoria (Australia)